In robotics and mechanical engineering, on November 15, 2008, China's Technology Daily reported Dr. Li Hiu Yeung and his research group of the New Concept Aircraft (ZHUHAI) Co., Ltd. had recently successfully developed the Mechanical Gecko named "Speedy Freelander".

The "Speedy Freelander" is a new intelligent robot with a compact and flexible body. Its possible use includes search, rescue, counter-terrorism, as well as scientific experiments and scientific exploration.

Mechanical Gecko "Freelander" comprehensively utilizes the optical, electromagnetic sensing and new communication methods, and optical, mechanical and electronic integration technology. According to the introduction by Dr. Li, this gecko robot with the artificial intelligence can rapidly climb up and down a variety of building walls, ground and wall fissures, and walk upside-down on the ceiling. It is able to adapt to the surfaces of smooth glass, rough, sticky or dusty walls as well as the various types of metallic materials. It can also identify and circumvent obstacles automatically. Its flexibility and speed are comparable to the natural gecko.

References

Further reading
 Reports on Chinese Science and Technology Daily
 Reports on SOHU website

Other videos on the mechanical gecko
 http://you.video.sina.com.cn/b/17435805-1569053923.html
 https://www.youtube.com/watch?v=RRzMeXtbJRo
 http://www.tudou.com/programs/view/1BOD206KD8o/

Climbing robots
Quadruped robots
Robotic animals
Robots of China
2008 robots
Geckos